Lord Bath may refer to:

 Earl of Bath, an extinct title in the peerages of England, Great Britain, and the United Kingdom
 Marquess of Bath, a title in the Peerage of Great Britain